Sam Neely (August 22, 1948 – July 19, 2006) was an American country and folk music musician, singer-songwriter, recording artist, and performer.

Born in Cuero, Texas, Neely began playing guitar at age ten. After moving with his family to Corpus Christi, Texas, he began playing in bands, including local group, Buckle. He made an appearance on the Merv Griffin Show in 1968 and was asked to write a song for the film, Tilt; though the movie was not released until 1978, it did include Neely's track, "Long Road to Texas".

Neely scored a string of minor hits in the 1970s on the country and pop charts and released a few albums which saw sales success. In 1978, he moved back to Corpus Christi and became the house musician for the Electric Eel. In 1983, he made a comeback on MCA Records.

On July 19, 2006, Neely collapsed and died while mowing his lawn at his home in Corpus Christi. He was 57. A funeral mass was held at St. Patrick Catholic parish in Corpus Christi on July 23, 2006.

Select discography

Albums

Singles

References

External links

1948 births
2006 deaths
Singer-songwriters from Texas
American country singer-songwriters
MCA Records artists
20th-century American singers
People from Cuero, Texas
Country musicians from Texas